{{DISPLAYTITLE:Muscarinic acetylcholine receptor M5}}

The human muscarinic acetylcholine receptor M5, encoded by the  gene, is a member of the G protein-coupled receptor superfamily of integral membrane proteins. It is coupled to Gq protein. Binding of the endogenous ligand acetylcholine to the M5 receptor triggers a number of cellular responses such as adenylate cyclase inhibition, phosphoinositide degradation, and potassium channel modulation. Muscarinic receptors mediate many of the effects of acetylcholine in the central and peripheral nervous system. The clinical implications of this receptor have not been fully explored; however, stimulation of this receptor is known to effectively decrease cyclic AMP levels and downregulate the activity of protein kinase A (PKA).

Ligands
No highly selective agonists or antagonists for the M5 receptor have been discovered as of 2018, but several non-selective muscarinic agonists and antagonists have significant affinity for M5.

The lack of selective M5 receptor ligands is one of the main reasons that the medical community has such a limited understanding of the M5 receptors effects as the possibility that any and/or all effects of non-selective ligands may be due to interactions with other receptors can not be ruled out. Some data may be obtained by observing which effects are common among semi-selective ligands (ex. a ligand of M1 and M5, a ligand of M2 and M5, and a ligand of M3 and M5), but until both a selective agonist and a selective antagonist of the M5 receptor are developed this data must be considered merely theoretical.

Agonists
 Milameline ((E)-1,2,5,6-Tetrahydro-1-methyl-3-pyridinecarboxaldehyde-O-methyloxime, CAS# 139886-32-1)
 Sabcomeline

Positive allosteric modulators
 ML-380
 ML-326
 VU-0238429: EC50 = 1.16 μM; >30-fold selectivity versus M1 and M3, inactive at M2 and M4.

Negative allosteric modulators
 ML375
VU6008667

Antagonists
 VU-0488130 (ML381)
 Xanomeline
 Diphenhydramine

See also 
 Muscarinic acetylcholine receptor

References

Further reading 

 
 
 
 
 
 
 
 
 
 
 
 
 
 
 

G protein-coupled receptors
Human proteins
Muscarinic acetylcholine receptors